Sheadrick Bond Turner (July 12, 1869 – September 30, 1927) was an American lawyer, newspaperman, and politician.

Biography
Turner was born in West Feliciana Parish, Louisiana. He was an African-American. Turner lived in Springfield, Illinois from 1885 to 1889. Turner then moved to Chicago, Illinois. He went to high school and University of Illinois College of Law. Turner was admitted to the Illinois bar. Turner also was the publisher and editor of two weekly publications, The State Capital of Springfield and The Chicago Idea. Turner was a Republican. He served in the Illinois House of Representatives from 1915 to 1917 and from 1919 until his death in 1927. Turner died in a hospital in Chicago, Illinois following surgery.

See also
List of African-American officeholders (1900-1959)

References

1869 births
1927 deaths
Lawyers from Chicago
Politicians from Chicago
Politicians from Springfield, Illinois
People from West Feliciana Parish, Louisiana
Editors of Illinois newspapers
University of Illinois College of Law alumni
Republican Party members of the Illinois House of Representatives
African-American state legislators in Illinois
19th-century American lawyers
20th-century African-American politicians
20th-century American politicians
African-American men in politics
African-American lawyers
20th-century American newspaper editors
American male journalists
African-American journalists